Bogusław Ogrodnik (born 20 February 1965 in Wrocław) – Polish mountaineer, swimmer, diver, traveller, entrepreneur.

Sports career

Seven Summits 
Reached Seven Summits, is the third and so far the fastest Polish mountaineer to do so (3 years and 11 months). The following mountains (in the order of reaching the tops) are part of the Seven Summits:
 Aconcagua (14 February 2004)
 Mount Everest (18 May 2006)
 Elbrus (10 October 2006)
 Mount Kosciuszko (19 November 2006)
 Kilimanjaro (18 February 2007)
 Piramida Carstensza (31 March 2007)
 Denali (26 May 2007)
 Mount Vinson (18 January 2008)

Swimming 
 Triple Crown of Open Water Swimming. Completed it as the first Pole crossing:
 English Channel (34 km) in 20:33:00 (27 July 2014)
 Catalina Channel (34 km) in 13:04:00 (6 June 2016)
 Manhattan Island (46.5 km) win 08:13:00 (13/5000 23 July 2017)
 Gulf of Gdans (23 August 2008) mid 20th century historic swimming route between Hel and Gdynia. 20 km in 8h46min. First crossing after more than 40 years break.
 Gulf of Puck 11 km – since July 2011, has completed multiple times the Sea Wolves marathon both with son Maciek and daughter Marta.
 Strait of Gibraltar (25 May 2013) in 5:28:00 (18,5 km) – no wetsuit, he together with 15-year-old son Maciek swam as first people from Europe to Africa.
 Otyliada (1 March 2014) – third place in national 12-hour swimming marathon.
 Strait of Messina (5 października, 2015) – double crossing in  1:45:07.
 Alcatraz Island to San Francisco (2015).

Winter swimming 
 International Winter Swimming Association World Cup 2015/16 – second place in F age category.
 „Ice Mile” – as first Pole he swam over 1650m in water 3.9 °C in 00:35:49.
 Polish Champion in Winter Swimming  - from 2014 to 2016 won multiple times different races.

Awards 
 2009: "President of City of Wroclaw Award" for contributions to the City

References

External links
 Bogusław Ogrodnik

1965 births
Living people
Polish mountain climbers
Polish summiters of Mount Everest
Summiters of the Seven Summits
Sportspeople from Wrocław
Manhattan Island swimmers